The 1909–10 Harvard Crimson men's ice hockey season was the 13th season of play for the program.

Season
Harvard began the season well, winning two preliminary games before taking the first two IHA contests by dominating the opposition. When they traveled to New York to play Princeton the Crimson were in good position to remain as the Intercollegiate Hockey Association but instead Harvard was shutout by the Tigers. The blanking was just the second time Harvard had failed to score in a game in program history, the first coming in their debut match in 1898.

After a poor showing against St. Francis Xavier Harvard ended with two further shutouts of conference opponents to finish second in the IHA.

Roster

Standings

Schedule and Results

|-
!colspan=12 style=";" | Regular Season

Scoring Statistics

Note: Assists were not recorded as a statistic.

References

Harvard Crimson men's ice hockey seasons
Harvard
Harvard
Harvard
Harvard
Harvard